Andrea Cassinelli (born 2 September 1993) is an Italian short track speed skater. He won a silver medal at the 2022 Winter Olympics in the mixed team relay.

References

Living people
1993 births
Short track speed skaters at the 2022 Winter Olympics
Olympic short track speed skaters of Italy
Italian male short track speed skaters
People from Moncalieri
Sportspeople from the Metropolitan City of Turin
Olympic silver medalists for Italy
Olympic bronze medalists for Italy
Medalists at the 2022 Winter Olympics
Olympic medalists in short track speed skating